Capáez is a rural barrio in the municipality of Adjuntas, Puerto Rico. Its population in 2010 was 1,054.

History
Puerto Rico was ceded by Spain in the aftermath of the Spanish–American War under the terms of the Treaty of Paris of 1898 and became an unincorporated territory of the United States. In 1899, the United States Department of War conducted a census of Puerto Rico finding that the population of Capáez barrio was 1,266.

Landmarks and places of interest 

 Capáez is home to some notable mountain peaks of the Cordillera Central such as Monte Hormiga (Spanish for 'ant mountain').
 Hacienda Monte Alto is an hacienda and coffee plantation dating to 1978.

See also

 List of communities in Puerto Rico

References

Barrios of Adjuntas, Puerto Rico